Borrisnoe is a townland just north of Templemore, County Tipperary, Ireland. It is part of the Devil's Bit/Barnane Éile mountain.

Townlands of County Tipperary